Aloa costalis is a moth that belongs to the family Erebidae. It was described by Francis Walker in 1865. It is found in north-eastern Australia.

References

Moths described in 1865
Spilosomina
Moths of Australia